The 1969 American 500 was a NASCAR Grand National Series event that was held on October 26, 1969, at North Carolina Motor Speedway in Rockingham, North Carolina.

A lot of the more notable NASCAR Cup Series drivers of this era failed to finish the race. Richard Petty tore his car up hitting the wall and the repairs were not enough to continue.

Background
North Carolina Motor Speedway was opened as a flat, one-mile oval on October 31, 1965. In 1969, the track was extensively reconfigured to a high-banked, D-shaped oval just over one mile in length. In 1997, North Carolina Motor Speedway merged with Penske Motorsports, and was renamed North Carolina Speedway. Shortly thereafter, the infield was reconfigured, and competition on the infield road course, mostly by the SCCA, was discontinued. Currently, the track is home to the Fast Track High Performance Driving School,

Summary
It took four hours and twenty-eight minutes to resolve 492 laps with LeeRoy Yarbrough emerging over David Pearson by 1½ laps. The other drivers in the top ten were: Buddy Baker, Dave Marcis, John Sears, Dick Brooks, Hoss Ellington, Ed Negre, Wendell Scott, and Neil Castles. Seven cautions were handed out by NASCAR officials for 66 laps. More than 33,000 people would attend this live racing event.

John Kennedy would receive the last-place finish due to a one-car crash on lap 17. This would be the 51st race out of the 54 officially sanctioned racing events of the 1969 NASCAR Grand National Series in addition to being the first race done with the present-day configuration for North Carolina Motor Speedway. Lennie Pond would make his NASCAR debut here.

The transition to purpose-built racecars began in the early 1960s and occurred gradually over that decade.  Changes made to the sport by the late 1960s brought an end to the "strictly stock" vehicles of the 1950s.

Ten notable crew chiefs were in attendance for the race; including Cotton Owens, Dick Hutcherson, Banjo Matthews and Harry Hyde.

Qualifying

Failed to qualify: Ed Hessert (#15)

Timeline
Section reference:
 Start: Charlie Glotzbach was the lead driver as the green flag was waved in the air.
 Lap 20: A two-car accident brought out a caution that lasted until lap 27.
 Lap 29: The driveshaft on Henley Gray's vehicle ceased effective operations on this lap.
 Lap 40: Clyde Lynn overheated his racing vehicle.
 Lap 72: The rear end came loose off Buddy Arrington's vehicle.
 Lap 125: Richard Brickhouse was involved in an accident off turn two.
 Lap 147: A two-car accident brought out a caution that lasted until lap 156.
 Lap 168: Cale Yarborough was involved in an accident off turn two.
 Lap 183: James Hylton blew his vehicle's engine off turn one.
 Lap 195: Buddy Young was involved in an accident off turn four.
 Lap 239: The wheel bearing came loose off Dub Simpson's vehicle.
 Lap 283: Charlie Glotzbach blew his vehicle's engine off turn three.
 Lap 304: Elmo Langley's brakes stopped working on this lap.
 Lap 313: The water pumps on Earl Brooks' vehicle ceased functioning.
 Lap 388: The suspension on E.J. Trivette's vehicle stopped working properly.
 Lap 391: The timing chain came loose off of Bobby Isaac's vehicle.
 Finish: LeeRoy Yarbrough was officially declared the winner of the race.

References

American 500
American 500
NASCAR races at Rockingham Speedway